Lower Woon is a hamlet in the civil parish of Luxulyan (where the 2011 census population was included) in  Cornwall, England, UK.

References

Hamlets in Cornwall